This is a list of all United States Supreme Court cases from volume 459 of the United States Reports:

External links

1982 in United States case law
1983 in United States case law